Pinoy pop or P-pop (also known as Philippine pop or Pilipino pop) refers to a contemporary pop music in the Philippines originating from the OPM genre. With its beginnings in the late 1970s, Pinoy pop is a growing genre in year of the 2020s. Through the 1990s to the 2000s, Pinoy pop was regularly showcased in the live band scene.

Groups such as Neocolours, Side A, Introvoys, the Teeth, Yano, True Faith, Passage and Freestyle popularized songs that clearly reflect the sentimental character of OPM pop of this era.

From 2010 to 2020, Philippine pop music or Pinoy pop went through a huge metamorphosis in its increased quality, budget, investment and variety, matching the country's rapid economic growth, and an accompanying social and cultural resurgence of its Asian identity. This was heard by heavy influence from K-pop and J-pop, a growth in Asian style ballads, idol groups, and EDM, and less reliance on Western genres, mirroring the Korean wave and similar Japanese wave popularity among millennial Filipinos and mainstream culture.

Etymology
In the early 1970s, Pinoy music or Pinoy pop emerged, often sung in Tagalog. It was a mix of rock, folk and ballads making political use of music similar to early hip hop but transcending class. The music was a "conscious attempt to create a Filipino national and popular culture" and it often reflected social realities and problems. As early as 1973, the Juan De la Cruz Band was performing "Ang Himig Natin" ("Our Music"), which is widely regarded as the first example of Pinoy rock. "Pinoy" gained popular currency in the late 1970s in the Philippines when a surge in patriotism made a hit song of Filipino folk singer Heber Bartolome's "Tayo'y mga Pinoy" ("We are Pinoys"). This trend was followed by Filipino rapper Francis Magalona's "Mga Kababayan Ko" ("My Countrymen") in the 1990s and Filipino rock band Bamboo's "Noypi" ("Pinoy" in reversed syllables) in the 2000s. Nowadays, Pinoy is used as an adjective to some terms highlighting their relationship to the Philippines or Filipinos. Pinoy rock was soon followed by Pinoy folk and later, Pinoy jazz. Although the music was often used to express opposition to then Philippine president Ferdinand Marcos and his use of martial law and the creating of the Batasang Bayan, many of the songs were more subversive and some just instilled national pride. Perhaps because of the cultural affirming nature and many of the songs seemingly being non-threatening, the Marcos administration ordered radio stations to play at least one – and later, three – Pinoy songs each hour. Pinoy music was greatly employed both by Marcos and political forces who sought to overthrow him.

History

Beginnings (1960s–1970s)

Filipino pop songs mainly referred to songs popularized since the 1960s, especially those in the ballad form, by major commercial artists like Pilita Corrales and Nora Aunor, and in the 1970s by Basil Valdez, Freddie Aguilar and Rey Valera.

Singer-songwriters Ryan Cayabyab and José Mari Chan rose to fame in the 1970s by composing original English love songs alongside modern Tagalog songs. Pioneer pop groups in the same decade include Manila sound groups APO Hiking Society and Hotdog.

Golden age of Filipino music
In the 1980s, disco group VST & Co. and pop icon Gary V. gave rise to dance-pop in the mainstream.

Prominence of rock-acoustic bands, belters, and balladeers (mid-1990s to present)
The early to mid-1990s saw the emergence of the pop-rock group, Eraserheads, considered as a turning-point in the OPM music scene. In the wake of their success was the emergence of a string of influential bands such as Yano, Siakol, Parokya ni Edgar, Grin Department, Rivermaya, Moonstar88 and Hungry Young Poets, each of which mixes the influence of a variety of pop and rock subgenres into their style.

Filipino rock continues to flourish at present with newer bands such as Hale, Cueshé, Sponge Cola, Chicosci, Kamikazee and Urbandub, and the emergence of the country's first virtual band, Mistula. Though only some of the spearheading bands are still fully intact, many old members have formed new bands such as Pupil, Sandwich, and Bamboo. A few band members such as Kitchie Nadal, Barbie Almalbis, and Rico Blanco have established steady solo careers.

Though rock bands have been dominating the mainstream since their commercialization in the '90s, acoustic groups were still regularly showcased in the live band scene such as Side A, True Faith, Neocolours, South Border and Freestyle popularized songs that clearly reflect the sentimental character of OPM pop. Popular acoustic acts like Nina, Juris (of MYMP) and Aiza Seguerra also prove the diversity of Filipino pop.

Solo belters and balladeers such as Regine Velasquez, Sharon Cuneta, Joey Albert, Donna Cruz, Zsa Zsa Padilla, Jaya, Jolina Magdangal and Martin Nievera had regular exposure on television and radio.

Re-emergence of R&B and novelty songs (2000s to present)
From the early 2000s onwards, Kyla, Nina and Jay R began to be pioneers of the contemporary R&B music with Francis M, Andrew E, Gloc-9, Abra, and Shehyee of hip-hop genre.

Local sing and dance groups SexBomb Girls and Viva Hot Babes began to popularize novelty songs among the masses.

Pinoy pop renaissance (2010s)
Since 2010, the genre of Pinoy pop drastically changed as the usual rock bands and novelty songs from the 1990s and 2000s started to fade out of the mainstream, creating the new pop genre without any influence of rock and hip-hop.

In 2010, Little Big Star 2nd runner-up and YouTube star Jake Zyrus became the first Asian to peak on the top 10 (at No. 8) of the Billboard 200 for his debut album. He was also one of the first Asian artists to have a song peak at No. 1 for Billboards Dance/Club Play Songs.

Notable pop artists of the 2010s include Toni Gonzaga, Moira Dela Torre, Ben&Ben, Yeng Constantino and Sarah Geronimo whose songs "Tala" and "Kilometro" were chosen by CNN Philippines as best songs of the decade.

The rise of Pinoy pop idol groups and new generation of solo artists (2020s)
From the influence of K-pop and J-pop, a new era of Pinoy pop was born. The Philippines' first idol group MNL48, a sister group of the J-pop group AKB48, started a new era for Pinoy pop when they debuted in 2018. Following them is the all-boy idol group SB19 who also debuted in 2018. They are the first Filipino act trained by a Korean entertainment company under the same system that catapulted K-pop artists into global stardom. SB19 is considered to be the first Pinoy pop idol group to chart on the Billboard Next Big Sound and Billboard Social 50. On November 20, 2019, SB19 made history by being the first Filipino artist to chart and debut on the Billboard Next Big Sound chart debuting and peaking at No. 5. On December 3, 2019, the group broke the all-time record of the longest stay at the No. 1 spot of Myx Daily Top Ten with "Go Up" staying at the top spot for 53 non-consecutive days. And on April 29, 2021, SB19 become the first Filipino and Southeast Asian act to be nominated in Billboard Music Awards for Top Social Artist along with BTS, Blackpink, Ariana Grande, and Seventeen. It marked the first-ever appearance of a Filipino artist in the Billboard Music Awards.

In May 2020, in the midst of pandemic, Star Hunt Academy led by Laurenti Dyogi introduced new Pinoy pop idol groups trainees in public, composed of 8 SHA Girls (now collectively known as BINI) and 5 SHA Boys (now collectively known as BGYO).

On January 29, 2021, Star Hunt Academy (SHA) Boys officially debuted as BGYO. A week after the release of their debut single "The Light", BGYO made a history for being the fastest Pinoy pop group to reach over a million views on YouTube views.

On February 14, 2021, Viva Entertainment introduced their newest P-pop group Alamat with the release of its debut single "kbye". Formed through PWEDE: The National Boyband Search, the group distinguishes itself as a multilingual and multiethnic boy band that sings in seven Philippine languages: Tagalog, Ilocano, Kapampangan, Bisaya, Hiligaynon, Bikolano, and Waray-Waray. Shortly after the release of their debut single, Alamat ranked second on the Pandora Predictions Chart, released on the week of February 23 and also holds the distinction of being the second P-pop group to make it on Billboard chart and the fastest-rising Pinoy act on the Billboard Next Big Sound chart, debuting at #2. On February 24, their debut single "kbye" ranked sixth on Myx Daily Top Ten chart. On March 30, Alamat and their debut single remained on the top of the UDOU's Top 10 Songs of the Week chart for 2 consecutive weeks.

On June 11, 2021, Star Hunt Academy (SHA) Girls officially debuted as BINI with their debut album "Born To Win". Versions in Bahasa, Japanese, Thai, and Spanish were also included in the album. The current members are Jhoanna, Colet, Maloi, Aiah, Stacey, Gwen, Mikha, and Sheena.

On October 7, 2021, BGYO released their debut album The Light, debuts and peaks at number 1 on iTunes Albums Chart in 5 countries—Philippines, Hong Kong, Singapore, United Arab Emirates and Saudi Arabia. It also charted in Canada, Thailand, Qatar, Australia, Norway, Malaysia and Mexico.

The 2020s also gave the Pinoy pop scene for a new generation of young solo artists. In March 2021, singer-songwriter Zack Tabudlo released his single "Binibini", which garnered 18.3 million streams on Spotify which led to became the top song on the said service's local Philippines charts for 2 consecutive months in April and May. 

In October 2021, Arthur Nery gained into fame when his best-selling single "Pagsamo" became the top-streaming song on Spotify's Daily Top 50 chart and has over 200,000 streams for the lyric video on YouTube for the first 12 hours.

 Culture 

 Single Promotion and Comeback(s) 
For many years and in today's Rise of Pinoy pop, The Philippines No.1 Music Channel MYX rank songs on various charts like  MYX Daily Top Ten, Pinoy MYX Countdown and  MYX Hit Chart. Pinoy pop also has Comeback stages such as ASAP and It's Showtime on ABS-CBN, All-Out Sundays, Eat Bulaga! on GMA Network and Wowowin! on All TV. Soon, the Philippines will have a Filipino Music Show on every music channel or TV Channel. They also promote the song through mall shows to help all pinoy pop artists to extend, promote and recognize their song throughout the Philippines as well as around the world.

 Awarding Shows 
Awarding Shows are also popular to recognize the local artists in the Philippines. Awarding Shows in the Philippines are made through different platforms including social media and others. These award shows includes Wish 107.5 Music Awards and MYX Music Awards that is held annually.

International recognition
In 2010, Jake Zyrus (then known under the mononym Charice''')'s self-titled album Charice debuted at number eight on the Billboard 200, making Zyrus the first Asian artist to reach the top 10 on the chart solo. While his lead single, "Pyramid", featuring Iyaz, reached number 17 on the UK Singles Chart, making Zyrus the first Filipino singer to have a top 20 single in the UK.

In 2015, Alden Richards' self-titled debut EP Alden Richards landed on Billboard World Albums Chart at number 10 for the week of October 17, 2015.

In 2017, Morissette was directly hand-picked by the organization of the Korean Asia Song Festival. She  lined up to perform with some of the top KPOP groups in Korea, including EXO and MAMAMOO, to name a few. She was invited to sing again at the Asia Song Festival in 2018. Morissette is the only Filipino musician to be invited to this event twice in a row to represent the Philippines. She sang a Korean song (Resignation), making her version by transposing the words into English and singing the concluding section of the song in Hangul (Korean Language).

In 2019, Pinoy pop idol group MNL48 performed at AKB48 Group Asia Festival 2019, the first held at Bangkok, Thailand on January 27, while the second one was held at Shanghai, China on August 24. Such performances catapulted MNL48 to the international stage, especially with other fans of their 48G counterparts. That same year, MNL48's Abby Trinidad was the group's representative on the New Year's Eve special of NHK's "Kohaku Uta Gassen", where along with other 48G counterparts, performed "Koi Soru Fortune Cookie". This is the third time a Filipino performer appeared on the said show, alongside Gary Valenciano and the band Smokey Mountain.

In 2020, Sarah Geronimo's single "Tala" entered at No. 12 on the U.S. Billboard World Digital Song Sales chart.

In 2020, Pinoy pop boy band SB19 became a Billboard Social 50 mainstay after peaking at No. 15 on the chart, likely due to the music video of their single "Alab". SB19 reached their highest position in the weekly Billboard Social 50 list two weeks after the release of their album, ranking second behind BTS on the week of August 15, 2020. A week later, by placing in the top five of two charts, the group achieved another Billboard milestone: 5th in the Emerging Artist list, their highest ranking to date, while staying 2nd in the Social 50 chart On the week of October 31, 2020, SB19's "Go Up" peaked at number 2 in Billboard's LyricFind Global chart after debuting at number 17 the week before,. while also making its initial appearance at number 9 in the U.S. version of the chart. Two weeks after, "Hanggang sa Huli" debuted at number 16 in Billboard's LyricFind U.S. chart while also debuting at number 4 in the chart's global version. On the week of November 28, 2020, the group reached another milestone, their first number 1 in a Billboard chart, after "Alab (Burning)" debuted at number 1 in Billboard's LyricFind Global chart, and at number 6 in the U.S. version of the chart.

MNL48, on the other hand, announced the formation of BABY BLUE, the group's newest sub-unit on September 1, 2020. Alongside with that announcement is the release of the sub-unit's single "Sweet Talking Sugar", released in collaboration with Tower Records Japan, a major Japanese music retailer. A nationwide tour in Japan of the said sub-unit is announced by HalloHallo Entertainment and Tower Records Japan, which will commence following the COVID-19 pandemic.

On January 31, two days after their debut, Star Magic's newest P-pop boy group BGYO was featured by EXO Baekhyun's Privé Alliance on the streetwear line's social media accounts, becoming the first P-Pop group to ever be featured by the clothing line.

On March 15, BGYO was also featured in the "Spring 2021 Issue" of L'Officiel Philippines, another milestone that marked the band as the first P-Pop group to be featured in an International French Magazine, L'Officiel.

Shortly after the release of their debut single "kbye" on February 14, 2021, Viva Entertainment's newest P-pop group Alamat ranked second on the Pandora Predictions Chart that was released on the week of February 23, the chart is one of the two important charts released by US streaming radio giant Pandora. Alamat also currently holds the distinction of being the second P-pop group after SB19 to make it on Billboard chart and the fastest-rising Pinoy act on the Billboard'' Next Big Sound chart, debuting at #2. Alamat's debut single is also included in Spotify's "Fresh Finds" playlist.

On April 29, 2021, SB19 become the first Filipino group and Southeast Asian act to make it to the final list of Billboard Music Awards for Top Social Artist along with BTS, Blackpink, Ariana Grande, and Seventeen.  It is also the first nomination for a Filipino Artist at the Billboard Music Awards.

On May 11, 2021, BGYO debuted at number 2 on weekly Billboard's Next Big Sound Chart, becoming the fifth Filipino act appeared in the weekly chart.

On August 24, 2021, BGYO re-entered at number 1 on weekly Billboard's Next Big Sound Chart and maintains the leadership for 2 consecutive weeks, becoming the first Filipino act to do so.

On October 8, 2021, American hip-hop dance crew Jabbawockeez posted a short dance cover of BGYO's "The Baddest" in different social media platforms and went viral.

On November 5, 2021, SB19 "Bazinga" debuted on Billboard Hot Trending Songs chart. The first Filipino Group to do so.

On December 8, 2021, SB19 become the first Filipino group and Southeast Asian act to make it to No. 1 on Billboard's Hot Trending Songs chart, powered by Twitter, leading for the first time.

On January 25, 2022 SB19 "Bazinga" Surpasses BTS "Butter" for Most Weeks Spent at No. 1 on Hot Trending Songs Chart.

On July 14, 2022 SB19 makes it to Teen Vogue’s ‘Favorite Boy Bands of All Time’ list alongside other iconic groups like BTS, The Beatles, Backstreet Boys, and One Direction.

Artist(s)

Some Pinoy pop artists are extremely popular in Philippines, and some also have fanbases in other countries—especially in Asia, but also in Western countries. They influence not only music, but also fashion. As of 2020, the top five best-selling artists in the Philippines charts history are MNL48, SB19, Sarah Geronimo, KZ Tandingan, and IV of Spades. Among the five, IV of Spades holds the record for being the only Pop band Artist.

See also
 Culture of the Philippines
 List of Philippine-based music groups
 Music of the Philippines
 Filipino
 Manila Sound
 Pinoy hip hop
 Pinoy rock
 Original Pilipino Music
 Rondalla
 PPOPCON

References
 

 
Philippine styles of music
Pop music by country
Pop music genres